Kamenka is a rural locality (a selo) in Chernigosky Selsoviet of Arkharinsky District, Amur Oblast, Russia. The population was 27 in 2018. There are 3 streets.

Geography 
Kamenka is located near the left bank of the Bureya River, 58 km north of Arkhara (the district's administrative centre) by road. Kulustay is the nearest rural locality.

References 

Rural localities in Arkharinsky District